Miniș may refer to several places in Romania:

Rivers
 Miniș (Bega), a tributary of the Bega in Timiș County
 Miniș, a tributary of the Cigher in Arad County
 Miniș (Nera), a tributary of the Nera in Caraș-Severin County
 Miniș, a tributary of the Topa in Bihor County

Settlements
 Miniș, a village in Ghioroc Commune, Arad County
 Minișu de Sus and Minișel, villages in Tauț Commune, Arad County